Elisabeth-Engelhardt-Literaturpreis is a literary prize in Germany, awarded every three years by the Landrat of Roth district Herbert Eckstein.

Laureates
 1997 Ingeborg Höverkamp
 2000 Klaus Schamberger 
 2003 Gerd Berghofer
 2006 Elfriede Bidmon
 2009 Willi Weglehner
 2012 Katharina Storck-Duvenbeck
 2015 Klaus "Billy" Wechsler
 2018 Monika Martin

References

External links
 The Elisabeth-Engelhardt-Literaturpreis at literaturportal-bayern.de

German literary awards